Jackson Hole is a valley in the US State of Wyoming.

Jackson Hole may also refer to:

Jackson, Wyoming, locally called Jackson Hole
Jackson Hole Airport, an airport in Jackson Hole valley
Jackson Hole Mountain Resort, a ski resort in Jackson Hole valley
Jackson Hole, China, a resort town

See also
 Jackson Hole Economic Symposium
 Jackson's Whole, a fictional location in the Vorkosigan Saga by Lois McMaster Bujold